Radio Free Iraq (in Arabic إذاعة العراق الحرّ, transliteration Izaa'at al 'Iraaq al Hurr) was a 24-hour radio station broadcasting in Arabic from Prague, Czech Republic, and directed to Iraq and the Iraqi diaspora. It started its broadcasts on 30 October 1998 and was part of the programming of Radio Free Europe/Radio Liberty (RFE/RL), which is funded by the United States Congress. The radio station also ran an online edition which had regularly updated news and reports in Arabic.

The service ended on July 31, 2015, after what RFE/RL characterized as a merger with Radio Sawa Iraq, part of the Arabic-language Sawa service that replaced the Voice of America Arabic service.

References

External links
Radio Free Iraq Official website

Radio stations established in 1998
Radio Free Europe/Radio Liberty
International broadcasters
Arabic-language radio stations
Iraqi diaspora
Radio stations disestablished in 2015